Duane G. "Tiny" Wilson (September 22, 1922 – August 18, 2000) was an American football and basketball coach and college athletics administrator. He served as the head football coach at Sterling College in Sterling, Kansas from 1946 to 1948, York College in York, Nebraska in 1953, and Westmar University in Le Mars, Iowa from 1957 to 1960, compiling a career college football coaching record of 18–42–4. Wilson was also the athletic director and head basketball coach at Sterling.

A native of Pennsylvania, Wilson earned a Bachelor of Arts degree from Sterling College and, in 1952, he received a Master of Arts degree from Westminster College in New Wilmington, Pennsylvania. He also did postgraduate work at Pennsylvania State University from 1948 to 1948.

Head coaching record

References

External links
 

1922 births
2000 deaths
Sterling Warriors athletic directors
Sterling Warriors football coaches
Sterling Warriors men's basketball coaches
Westmar Eagles athletic directors
Westmar Eagles football coaches
York Panthers football coaches
Pennsylvania State University alumni
Sterling College alumni
Westminster College (Pennsylvania) alumni
People from Lawrence County, Pennsylvania
Coaches of American football from Pennsylvania
Basketball coaches from Pennsylvania